The 14703 / 14704 Jaisalmer–Lalgarh Express is an Express train belonging to North Western Railway zone that runs between  and  in India. It is currently being operated with 14703/14704 train numbers on a daily basis.

Service

The 14703/Jaisalmer Lalgarh Express has an average speed of 48 km/hr and covers 314 km in 6h 35m. The 14704/Lalgarh Jaisalmer Express has an average speed of 50 km/hr and covers 314 km in 6h 20m.

Route & Halts 

The important halts of the train are:

Coach composition

The train has standard ICF rakes with max speed of 110 kmph. The train consists of 12 coaches:

 2 AC III Tier
 1 Chair Car
 6 General
 2 Second-class Luggage/parcel van

Traction

Both trains are hauled by an Abu Road Loco Shed-based WDM-3A diesel locomotive from Jaisalmer to Bikaner and vice versa.

Rake sharing

The train shares its rake with 12467/12468 Leelan Express.

See also 

 Jaisalmer railway station
 Lalgarh Junction railway station
 Leelan Express

Notes

References

External links 

 14703/Jaisalmer Lalgarh Express
 14704/Lalgarh Jaisalmer Express

Transport in Jaisalmer
Transport in Bikaner
Express trains in India
Rail transport in Rajasthan